Sadan may refer to:
Sədan, a village and municipality in Azerbaijan
Sadan, Burma, a village in Kani Township
Sadan, Iran, a village in Golestan Province, Iran
Sadan, South Khorasan, a village in South Khorasan Province, Iran
Sadan peoples, Indo-Aryan ethnic groups in India
Sadanic languages, languages of these people
Nagpuria people or Sadan, ethnic group of Jharkhand, India
Sadani or Sadri language, Indo-Aryan language spoken by the ethnic group

See also
Sadri (disambiguation)
Sadr (disambiguation)